Sri Kalahastheeswara Institute of Technology, (SKIT), is an engineering college in Tirupati district, Andhra Pradesh, India. The college is located in the holy temple town of Sri Kalahasti and was established in 1997. It is 38 km away from the pilgrim center of Tirupati (city).

The school has branches in Mechanical Engineering, Mechatronics Engineering, Electrical and Electronics Engineering, Electronics and Communication Engineering, Computer Science Engineering and Civil Engineering with an intake of 60 seats in each branch. The college is affiliated with Jawaharlal Nehru Technological University, Anantapur, Andhra Pradesh and is approved by the All India Council for Technical Education (AICTE), New Delhi.

Department of Electronics and Communication Engineering
The Electronics engineering had no special block but it has its labs in almost all departments.

Department of Mechanical Engineering
The mechanical engineering block behind the main building opened to classes in 2004. The Department of Mechanical Engineering holds laboratory facilities like Workshop/Production Engineering Lab, Solid Mechanics/Metallurgy and Materials Lab, Fluid Mechanics/Hydraulic Machinery Lab, Thermal Engineering (Automobile) Lab, Heat Transfer Lab, Metrology and Machine Tools lab, refrigeration & air conditioning lab, and mission tools lab.

Department of Computer Science and Engineering

The Department of Computer Science and Engineering has been functioning since the inception of the inception of the institute. The CSE department is the hub for all departments providing necessary logistics related to computes and networking. The department mentions six laboratories and internet lab. The department has evolved into a mini research center providing scholarly guidance to B.Tech., M.Tech. and Poly technique students in their project work. It is served with dedicated and expert faculty and skilled staff, who are experts in networking, server maintenance and designing labs.

List of laboratories
 Computer Programming Lab 
 IT workshop
 Distributed Systems Lab
 Network Programming Lab
 UNIX Lab
 Advanced English Communications Lab
 Web Technologies Lab
 Internet and Research Lab

The Internet Lab has 8 Mbit/s leased line internet facility and 20 Mbit/s NMEICT VPNOBB to cater the needs of the students, research scholars and faculty of SKIT. As a part of continuing education, the department organizes various guest lectures, seminars and workshops by inviting people from Academia and Industry. We have been associated with eminent industries to carry out research/consultancy work.

References

External links
Official website

Engineering colleges in Andhra Pradesh
Educational institutions established in 1997
1997 establishments in Andhra Pradesh